Robert Lee Williams III (born October 17, 1997), nicknamed "Time Lord", is an American professional basketball player for the Boston Celtics of the National Basketball Association (NBA). He played college basketball for the Texas A&M Aggies.

Williams was drafted 27th overall in the 2018 NBA draft by the Celtics. He had a breakout season in 2021–22, which saw him being named to the NBA All-Defensive Second Team and reaching the NBA Finals as the Celtics' starting center.

High school career
Williams attended North Caddo High School in Vivian, Louisiana. A consensus four-star recruit, he ranked 50th overall in ESPN’s Top 100 for the class of 2016 and was the number one prospect in the state of Louisiana. He committed to Texas A&M University to play college basketball.

College career
In his first college game, he scored five points and had five blocks and seven rebounds. He was named SEC Defensive Player of the Year and earned 2nd Team All-SEC honors after averaging 11.9 points and a team-high 8.2 rebounds per game as a freshman in 2016–17.

On March 21, despite being credited as a potential first round lottery player, Williams decided to forgo the 2017 NBA draft and stay for another season at Texas A&M.

Following Texas A&M's loss in the 2018 NCAA men's basketball tournament, Williams announced his intention to forgo his final two seasons of collegiate eligibility and declare for the 2018 NBA draft, where he was expected to be a first round selection. Williams was viewed as a potential lottery pick for the 2017 NBA draft and 2018 NBA draft.

Professional career

Boston Celtics (2018–present)
Come the 2018 NBA draft, instead of being a lottery pick, Williams fell to the 27th overall pick where he was selected by the Boston Celtics due to concerns about his work ethic. On July 5, 2018, the Boston Celtics signed Williams.  Williams did not initially make a good impression, being criticized for showing up late and missing team functions. His reputation for missing flights and video meetings caused him to earn the moniker "Time Lord" on online Boston Celtics fandoms. 

Williams made his professional debut on October 23, 2018, playing 4 minutes during the Celtics' loss to Orlando Magic, before being assigned to the Maine Red Claws on November 2.  Throughout November and December, Williams split his time between the G League and the NBA, before starting to gain more game time with the Celtics following an injury to Al Horford. On December 11, 2018, Williams blocked two shots by NBA All Star Anthony Davis during a game against the New Orleans Pelicans.

During the 2021 NBA playoffs, Williams dealt with a turf toe injury. In Game 1 of the first round against the Brooklyn Nets, Williams blocked 9 shots to set a team playoff record for blocks in a game. He also scored 11 points and grabbed 9 rebounds. Despite this record, the team lost the game. The injury hobbled Williams for the remainder of the series and Williams left Game 3 with a sprained ankle after playing just 6 minutes. He missed games 4 and 5, and the team lost the series 4–1.

On December 31, 2021, Williams recorded his first career triple-double, putting up 10 points, 11 rebounds, and 10 assists, in a 123–108 win over the Phoenix Suns. On March 28, 2022, the Celtics announced that Williams had suffered a torn meniscus in his left knee and would be out indefinitely. Two days later, he underwent surgery and was ruled out for at least 4-to-6 weeks.

Career statistics

NBA

Regular season

|-
| style="text-align:left;"| 
| style="text-align:left;"| Boston
| 32 || 2 || 8.8 || .706 ||  || .600 || 2.5 || .2 || .3 || 1.3 || 2.5
|-
| style="text-align:left;"| 
| style="text-align:left;"| Boston
| 29 || 1 || 13.4 || .727 ||  || .647 || 4.4 || .9 || .8 || 1.2 || 5.2
|-
| style="text-align:left;"| 
| style="text-align:left;"| Boston
| 52 || 13 || 18.9 || .721 || .000 || .616 || 6.9 || 1.8 || .8 || 1.8 || 8.0
|-
| style="text-align:left;"| 
| style="text-align:left;"| Boston
| 61 || 61 || 29.6 || .736 || .000 || .722 || 9.6 || 2.0 || .9 || 2.2 || 10.0
|- class="sortbottom"
| style="text-align:center;" colspan="2"| Career
| 174 || 77 || 19.9 || .728 || .000 || .665 || 6.6 || 1.4 || .7 || 1.7 || 7.2

Playoffs

|-
| style="text-align:left;"| 2019
| style="text-align:left;"| Boston
| 3 || 0 || 4.3 || .500 || .000 || 1.000 || 2.3 || .0 || .0 || .0 || 1.3
|-
| style="text-align:left;"| 2020
| style="text-align:left;"| Boston
| 13 || 0 || 11.5 || .742 || .000 || .333 || 3.9 || .8 || .2 || .5 || 3.7
|-
| style="text-align:left;"| 2021
| style="text-align:left;"| Boston
| 3 || 0 || 15.3 || .643 || .000 || .500 || 5.0 || .7 || .3 || 3.0 || 6.3
|-
| style="text-align:left;"| 2022
| style="text-align:left;"| Boston
| 17 || 15 || 23.2 || .679 || .000 || .893 || 6.2 || 1.0 || .7 || 2.2 || 7.7
|- class="sortbottom"
| style="text-align:center;" colspan="2"| Career
| 36 || 15 || 16.7 || .688 || .000 || .789 || 4.9 || .8 || .4 || 1.5 || 5.6

College

|-
| style="text-align:left;"| 2016–17
| style="text-align:left;"| Texas A&M
| 31 || 17 || 25.8 || .558 || .111 || .590 || 8.2 || 1.4 || .7 || 2.5 || 11.9
|-
| style="text-align:left;"| 2017–18
| style="text-align:left;"| Texas A&M
| 30 || 23 || 25.6 || .668 || .000 || .471 || 9.2 || 1.4 || .8 || 2.6 || 10.4
|- class="sortbottom"
| style="text-align:center;" colspan="2"| Career
| 61 || 40 || 25.7 || .624 || .067 || .541 || 8.7 || 1.4 || .7 || 2.5 || 11.1

Personal life
In July 2018, Williams was revealed to have popliteal artery entrapment syndrome (PAES) in both legs. If it degenerates, the vascular disease could require a surgical procedure in the future.

Nickname
Early in his career, Williams has attracted the nickname "Time Lord" from Celtics fans, in part based upon his timekeeping faux pas upon signing with the team. This has, in turn, gained attention from Timex. Danny Ainge has been recorded as preferring the nickname "Lob".

References

External links

Texas A&M Aggies bio

1997 births
Living people
North Caddo High School alumni
American men's basketball players
Basketball players from Shreveport, Louisiana
Boston Celtics draft picks
Boston Celtics players
Centers (basketball)
Maine Red Claws players
Power forwards (basketball)
Texas A&M Aggies men's basketball players